Xenisthmus is the most well-known genus in the family Xenisthmidae, which is regarded as a synonymous with the Eleotridae, a part of Gobiiformes. These small to very small fish are known as wrigglers, and live in reefs and among rubble in the Indo-Pacific.

Species
Xenisthmus contains the following species:

Xenisthmus africanus J.L.B. Smith, 1958 – flathead wriggler or African wrigglerXenisthmus balius Gill & Randall, 1994 – freckled wrigglerXenisthmus chapmani (Schultz, 1966) Xenisthmus chi Gill & Hoese, 2004 – chi wrigglerXenisthmus clarus (Jordan & Seale, 1906) – clear wrigglerXenisthmus eirospilus Gill & Hoese, 2004 – spotted wrigglerXenisthmus oligoporus Gill, Bogorodsky & Mal, 2017Xenisthmus polyzonatus (Klunzinger, 1871) – bullseye wriggler or polyzonate wrigglerXenisthmus semicinctus'' Gill & Hoese, 2004

References